Taipingqiao Town is an urban town  in Liuyang City, Changsha City, Hunan Province, People's Republic of China.  As of the 2000 census it had a population of 20,129 and an area of 99.8 square kilometers. Taipingqiao town merged to Jili subdistrict on November 18, 2015.

Cityscape
The town is divided into 4 villages and 2 communities, the following areas: Taiping Community, Jinmei Community, Tangjiayuan Village, Hongyuan Village, Xingzhen Village, and Hesheng Village (太平社区和锦美社区，唐家园村、宏源村、星镇村和合盛村).

References

Former township-level divisions of liuyang